Helcystogramma albinervis is a moth in the family Gelechiidae. It was described by Aleksey Maksimovich Gerasimov in 1929. It is found in Hungary, Romania, Slovakia, Poland, Latvia, Ukraine and Russia.

The wingspan is about 15 mm.

References

Moths described in 1929
albinervis
Moths of Europe